The 1996 election for the Newcastle City Council was held in May 1996. The Conservative Party was wiped out, the Liberal Democrats remained the Opposition and Labour slightly increased their majority.

1996
20th century in Newcastle upon Tyne
1996 English local elections